Hello FM (106.4,92.7,91.5 MHz) is one of the private radio stations operating from different locations in Tamil Nadu. It is owned by Malar publications, Chennai. It is licensed to use the FM band frequency 106.4 MHz. It started in 2006 broadcasting from Chennai and Coimbatore. Later, in 2007 it expanded its broadcast to other cities in Tamil Nadu such as Madurai, Thiruchirappalli, Thirunelveli, Thoothukudi and to the union territory of Puducherry.

Locations
 Dharmapuri 91.5 MHz
 Thoothukkudi 106.4 MHz
 Thiruchirappalli 106.4 MHz
 Thirunelveli 106.4 MHz
 Chennai 106.4 MHz
 Kovai  106.4 MHz
 Madurai 106.4 MHz
 Pudhucherry 106.4 MHz
 Dharmapuri 92.7 MHz

 Dharmapuri 91.5 MHz
 Dubai 106.5 MHz (Radio Gilli)

See also
 Dina Thanthi
 Malai Malar
 DT NEXT(Chennai Based Daily English Newspaper) 
 Thanthi TV
 Media in Chennai
 Media in Coimbatore

References

External links
 http://www.hello.fm 
 https://www.facebook.com/hellofm106.4
 https://twitter.com/HelloFM1064

Radio stations in Chennai
Radio stations in Coimbatore
Radio stations in Madurai
Radio stations in Tiruchirappalli
Radio stations established in 2006
Thanthi Group
Companies based in Chennai
2006 establishments in Tamil Nadu
Indian companies established in 2006